Brooklyn Girl or Brooklyn Girls may refer to:

Brooklyn Girl (novel), (original title: La Fille de Brooklyn), novel by Guillaume Musso
"Brooklyn Girls" (Charles Hamilton song), 2008 song 
"Brooklyn Girls" (Catey Shaw song), 2014 song